Abel M. Chambeshi (born 16 September 1944) is a Zambian politician. He served as Member of the National Assembly for Mkushi South from 1996 until 2006 and held several ministerial portfolios.

Biography
Chambeshi contested the 1996 general elections as the Movement for Multi-Party Democracy (MMD) candidate in Mkushi South. He was elected to the National Assembly with a 1,562 majority. After being made Minister for Central Province, he was appointed Minister of Sport, Youth and Child Development in 1999. At the end 1999 a cabinet reshuffle saw him become Minister of Science, Technology and Vocational Training. In February 2001 he was appointed Minister of Lands.

Chambeshi was re-elected in the December 2001 general elections with a reduced majority of 317. In January 2002 he returned to his previous portfolio, becoming Minister of Science, Technology and Vocational Training again. In January 2005 he was appointed Minister of Transport and Communications.

Chambeshi did not contest the 2006 general elections.

References

1944 births
Living people
Members of the National Assembly of Zambia
Movement for Multi-Party Democracy politicians
Provincial Ministers of Zambia
Sport, Youth and Child Development ministers of Zambia
Higher Education ministers of Zambia
Lands and Natural Resources ministers of Zambia
Transport ministers of Zambia